The Parker Society was a text publication society set up in 1841 to produce editions of the works of the early Protestant writers of the English Reformation. It was supported by both the High Church and evangelical wings of the Church of England, and was established in reaction against the Tractarian movement of the 1830s. Its Council was dominated by evangelicals, but not to the exclusion of other views.

In response, a group of Tractarians founded the Library of Anglo-Catholic Theology.

The Society took its name from Matthew Parker (1504–1575), Archbishop of Canterbury from 1559 to 1575, and a prominent collector of manuscripts. It published four or five volumes a year, to 1853.

Publications
A General Index to the Publications of the Parker Society was published in 1855 by Henry Gough; the publications are listed on pp. vii–viii.

Single authors

Collections

See also
Library of Anglo-Catholic Theology
Library of the Fathers

Notes

1841 establishments in the United Kingdom
Text publication societies
Defunct learned societies of the United Kingdom